The 2017 Red Bull MotoGP Rookies Cup was the eleventh season of the Red Bull MotoGP Rookies Cup. The season, for the fifth year contested by the riders on equal KTM 250cc 4-stroke Moto3 bikes, was held over 13 races in seven meetings on the Grand Prix motorcycle racing calendar, beginning at Jerez on 6 May and ending on 24 September at the MotorLand Aragón. Japanese rider Kazuki Masaki won the championship, securing the title after the first Aragón race.

Calendar

Entry list

Championship standings
Points were awarded to the top fifteen riders, provided the rider finished the race.

References

External links

Red Bull MotoGP Rookies Cup
Red Bull MotoGP Rookies Cup racing seasons